The American rock band Green Day has released 13 studio albums, four live albums, four compilation albums, one soundtrack album, four video albums, 11 extended plays, four box sets, 43 singles, 10 promotional singles and 47 music videos. The band has sold over 75 million records worldwide, including more than 24 million in certified album sales in the United States. Green Day released their first two studio albums, 1,039/Smoothed Out Slappy Hours (1991) (consisting of the original 39/Smooth as well as their first two EPs 1,000 Hours and Slappy) and Kerplunk (1991), through the independent label Lookout! Records before signing to major label Reprise Records. Dookie, the band's first album on the label and third studio album overall, was released in February 1994. It was a breakout success, selling over 10 million copies in the United States and 20 million copies worldwide. Dookie spawned five singles, including the international hits "Longview", "Basket Case" and "When I Come Around". The album placed Green Day at the forefront of the 1990s punk rock revival.

Insomniac, the band's fourth studio album, was released in October 1995. While not as successful as Dookie, the album managed to peak at number two on the US Billboard 200 and received a double platinum certification from the Recording Industry Association of America (RIAA). Nimrod followed in October 1997; it peaked at number ten on the Billboard 200. Four singles were released from Nimrod; the most successful of these was "Good Riddance (Time of Your Life)", which hit the top ten in countries such as Australia and Canada. The band's sixth studio album Warning was released in October 2000 to mild commercial success, peaking at number four on the Billboard 200 and only earning a gold certification from the RIAA.

Their seventh studio album American Idiot reignited the band's popularity with a younger generation. Becoming the band's first album to top the Billboard 200, American Idiot sold over six million copies in the United States, and over 14 million copies worldwide. The album spawned five commercially successful singles: "American Idiot", "Jesus of Suburbia", "Boulevard of Broken Dreams", "Holiday", and "Wake Me Up When September Ends".

The band's eighth studio album 21st Century Breakdown followed in May 2009, topping the Billboard 200 and being certified platinum by the RIAA. Two singles from the album—"Know Your Enemy" and "21 Guns"—became top 40 hits on the US Billboard Hot 100. A trilogy of studio albums—¡Uno!, ¡Dos!, and ¡Tré!—were released toward the end of 2012. ¡Uno!, ¡Dos! and ¡Tré! peaked at numbers two, nine and thirteen respectively on the Billboard 200.

In 2016, another studio album, Revolution Radio was released and topped the Billboard 200. 
On February 7, 2020, their most recent album, Father of All Motherfuckers, was released and debuted in the top five of the Billboard 200 and topped the Australian, Canadian and UK charts in its first week.

Albums

Studio albums

Live albums

Compilation albums

Soundtrack albums

Demo albums

Video albums

Box sets

Extended plays

Singles

1990s

2000s

2010s and 2020s

Promotional singles

Other charted songs

Other appearances

Soundtracks
Films

Video games

Music videos

Notes

References

External links
 Official website
 Green Day at AllMusic
 
 

Discography
Discographies of American artists
Pop punk group discographies